Diphucephala is a genus of beetles belonging to the subfamily Melolonthinae of family Scarabaeidae.

The species of this genus are found in Australia.

Species:

Diphucephala affinis 
Diphucephala angusticeps 
Diphucephala aurolimbata 
Diphucephala aurulenta 
Diphucephala azureipennis 
Diphucephala barnardi 
Diphucephala bernhardti 
Diphucephala beryllina 
Diphucephala carteri 
Diphucephala castanoptera 
Diphucephala childrenii 
Diphucephala coerulea 
Diphucephala colaspidoides 
Diphucephala concinna 
Diphucephala crebra 
Diphucephala cribripennis 
Diphucephala cuprea 
Diphucephala dentipes 
Diphucephala dicksoniae 
Diphucephala edwardsi 
Diphucephala elegans 
Diphucephala fulgida 
Diphucephala furcata 
Diphucephala glabra 
Diphucephala hirtipennis 
Diphucephala hirtipes 
Diphucephala hopei 
Diphucephala humeralis 
Diphucephala ignota 
Diphucephala insularis 
Diphucephala lateralis 
Diphucephala laticeps 
Diphucephala laticollis 
Diphucephala latipennis 
Diphucephala lineata 
Diphucephala mastersi 
Diphucephala minima 
Diphucephala montana 
Diphucephala nigritarsis 
Diphucephala nitens 
Diphucephala nitidicollis 
Diphucephala obscura 
Diphucephala obsoleta 
Diphucephala parviceps 
Diphucephala parvula 
Diphucephala prasina 
Diphucephala puberula 
Diphucephala pubescens 
Diphucephala pubiventris 
Diphucephala pulchella 
Diphucephala pulcherrima 
Diphucephala purpureitarsis 
Diphucephala pygidialis 
Diphucephala pygmaea 
Diphucephala quadratigera 
Diphucephala rectipennis 
Diphucephala regalis 
Diphucephala richmondia 
Diphucephala rufipes 
Diphucephala rugosa 
Diphucephala rugosula 
Diphucephala sericea 
Diphucephala smaragdula 
Diphucephala sordida 
Diphucephala spreta 
Diphucephala tantilla 
Diphucephala tarsalis 
Diphucephala waterhousei

References

Scarabaeidae